Katja Keitaanniemi (born 1973) is the President and CEO of OP Corporate Bank, which is the most significant subsidiary of OP Financial Group. According to Corporate Finance Institute, OP Corporate Bank is among the top corporate banks in Finland. Keitaanniemi has been on the list of Finland's most powerful female executives by the business weekly Talouselämä in 2020 and 2021.

Career
Keitaanniemi is a Finnish business executive and Licentiate of Science in Technology. She has worked as OP Corporate Bank’s President and CEO since 2018 and is a member of OP Cooperative's Executive Management Team. Large Finnish corporations selected OP Corporate Bank as Finland's best corporate bank in 2020.

Previously, Keitaanniemi was Finnvera Oyj's Executive Vice President, Small and medium-sized enterprises and member of the Executive Group between 2014 and 2018. Keitaanniemi had also acted at Swedbank as Senior Vice President, Head of Investment Banking Finland and Member of Management Group of Global IB and SVP, Head of Research, Member of Executive Group. Before her career in Swedbank, Keitaanniemi was Director of Research at eQ Bank and Senior Analyst at Nordea Securities, Forest and Paper Products.

Awards and notability
Keitaanniemi has been on the list of Finland's most powerful female executives by the business weekly Talouselämä in 2020 and 2021. The Financial Times has selected Keitaanniemi as Europe's best forest industry analyst and she is also the first one who ranked among the three top on the list for four consecutive years.

References

1973 births
Finnish bankers
Chief executives in the finance industry
People from Harjavalta
Living people